Tim Livingstone (born 21 September 1967) is a former Australian rules footballer who played with Richmond in the Australian Football League (AFL).

Playing career
Livingstone made two appearances in the 1992 AFL season, late in the year, and played a further six senior games in 1993, also towards the end of the season.

He also played football for North Ringwood and Box Hill. In 1995 he won the Frank Johnson Medal for his performance with the VFL's representative team.

Post-AFL career
Livingstone is currently the Head of Player and Coach Development at Richmond.

References

External links
 
 

1967 births
Australian rules footballers from Victoria (Australia)
Richmond Football Club players
Box Hill Football Club players
Living people